Manu S. Pillai (born 1990) is an Indian author and popular historian.

Early life and education
Manu S. Pillai was born in Mavelikkara, Kerala in 1990. He grew up in Pune. He got his Bachelor's Degree in Economics from Fergusson College, Pune. He got a Master's Degree in International Relations from King's College London. 

Following his education, he worked with the Parliamentary office of Shashi Tharoor in New Delhi and Lord Karan Bilimoria in London. He also worked as a researcher on the BBC Series, Incarnations with Sunil Khilnani, which tells the story of India through fifty great lives. In 2017, he became a full time historian and writer. He is currently pursuing his PhD at King's College, London.

Pillai is known for his debut non-fiction The Ivory Throne: Chronicles of the House of Travancore for which he won the Sahitya Akademi Yuva Puraskar in 2017. The story is expected to be adapted into a web series by Arka Mediaworks. Rebel Sultans, Pillai's second work, narrates the story of the Deccan from the close of the thirteenth century to the dawn of the eighteenth century. His most recent book is The Courtesan, the Mahatma and the Italian Brahmin. He has announced that he is working on his next work which is due for publishing in 2022.

List of works

References

External links
Official Website

Indian historical novelists
Living people
1990 births
Writers from Kerala